New Dimensions IV is an anthology of original science fiction short stories edited by Robert Silverberg, the fourth in a series of twelve. It was first published in paperback by Signet/New American Library in October 1974.

The book collects ten novellas, novelettes and short stories by various science fiction authors.

Contents
"After the Dreamtime" (Richard A. Lupoff)
"The Bible After Apocalypse" (Laurence M. Janifer)
"Outer Concentric" (Felix C. Gotschalk)
"The Examination" (Felix C. Gotschalk)
"The Colors of Fear" (Terry Carr)
"Ariel" (Roger Elwood)
"State of the Art" (Barry N. Malzberg)
"Among the Metal-and-People People" (David R. Bunch)
"Animal Fair" (R. A. Lafferty)
"Strangers" (Gardner R. Dozois)

Awards
The anthology placed second in the 1975 Locus Poll Award for Best Original Anthology.

"After the Dreamtime" was a finalist for the 1975 Hugo Award for Best Novelette and placed ninth in the 1975 Locus Poll Award for Best Novelette.

References

1974 anthologies
Science fiction anthologies
Robert Silverberg anthologies
1970s science fiction works
Signet Books books